Narseh (also spelled Narses or Narseus; , New Persian: , Narsē) was the seventh Sasanian King of Kings of Iran from 293 to 303.

The youngest son of Shapur I, Narseh served as the governor of Sakastan, Hind and Turan under his father. Shapur I was eventually succeeded by his son Hormizd I, who died after a reign of one year. Shapur I's eldest son Bahram I, who had never been considered as a candidate for succession to the throne by his father, ascended the throne with the aid of the powerful Zoroastrian priest Kartir. He then made a settlement with Narseh to give up his entitlement to the throne in return for the governorship of the important frontier province of Armenia, which was a persistent cause for war between the Roman and Sasanian Empires. Narseh held the title of Vazurg Šāh Arminān ("Great King of Armenia"), which was used by the heir to the throne in the early Sasanian times. Nevertheless, Narseh most likely still viewed Bahram I as a usurper.

The succession of Bahram I's son, Bahram II seemingly occurred without any issues. However, after Bahram II's death in 293, the noble Wahnam had the latters son Bahram III unwillingly crowned. The nobility did not support Bahram III's kingship, and asked Narseh to rule instead. Ultimately, Bahram III abdicated as shah, while Wahnam was executed. Narseh's accession to the throne makes him the first Sasanian shah to not ascend the throne as a crown prince. The circumstances of Narseh's rise to power are detailed in the Paikuli inscription, which he made as his own Res Gestae Divi Augusti and to legitimize his rule.

Three years after his accession, war erupted between the Sasanians and Romans once again. In the spring of 297, Narseh's forces inflicted a heavy defeat on the forces of Galerius. The following year, however, Narseh was to suffer a heavy defeat at Satala; his wives, children, and many Iranian nobles were taken as prisoners of war. Due to this ignominious defeat, Narseh was forced to accept a peace treaty prescribed by the Romans, ceding them several areas at the Sasanian-Roman border.

Narseh is notable for returning to the religious tolerance policy of his father.

Name 
The name of Narseh stems from the Old Iranian theophoric name of *naryasa(n)ha-, meaning "men’s praise". Narseh's name is listed as nrshy in Middle Persian and nryshw in Parthian on the Paikuli inscription and Naqsh-e Rostam. The Greek version of his name is also listed in the inscriptions, as Narsaiēs or Narsaios. However, other Greek sources generally spell his name as Narsēs. The name of Narseh is known in other languages as; ; Syriac ܢܪܣܝ Nrsy;  Narsi; Armenian Nerseh; Coptic Narsaph, as well as Narseos.

Early life and governorship
Narseh seems to have been the youngest son of Shapur I, being born between 228 and 233 during the reign of his grandfather Ardashir I. Narseh is quoted in an inscription by his father Shapur I as the governor of the eastern Sasanian provinces of Hind, Sakastan and Turan. During his term as governor, he reportedly played an important role in the affairs of the eastern portion of the empire. Shapur I died in 270, and was succeeded by Hormizd I, whose rule only lasted one year due to death. Narseh's older brother Bahram I, who was never considered a candidate for succession of the throne by their father, probably due to having a mother of lowly origin, ascended the throne with the aid of the powerful Zoroastrian priest Kartir.

He then made a settlement with Narseh to give up his entitlement to the throne in return for the governorship of the important frontier province of Armenia, which was constantly the source of war between the Roman and Sasanian Empires. Narseh held the title of Vazurg Šāh Arminān ("Great King of Armenia"), which was used by the heir to the throne. Nevertheless, Narseh still most likely viewed Bahram I as a usurper. Bahram I's reign however, lasted shortly, ending on September 274 with his death. His son Bahram II succeeded him as shah, seemingly without any issues; he may have been aided by Kartir to ascend the throne over Narseh. This most likely frustrated Narseh, who had now been neglected from succession several times.

Rise

Following the death of Bahram II in 293, his son Bahram III was unwillingly proclaimed shah in Pars by a group of nobles led by Wahnam and supported by Adurfarrobay, governor of Meshan. However, Bahram III was considered a weak ruler by the other nobles, who decided to pledge allegiance to Narseh, the last remaining son of Shapur, and someone who was perceived as being a stronger leader and one who would be able to bring glory to Iran. Four months into Bahram III's reign, Narseh was summoned to Mesopotamia at the request of many members of the Iranian nobility. He met them in the passage of Paikuli in the province of Garmekan, where he was firmly approved and likely also declared shah for the first time. The reasons behind the nobles favour of Narseh might have been due to his jurisdiction as governor, his image as an advocate of the Zoroastrian religion and as an insurer for harmony and prosperity of the empire. His ancestry from the early Sasanian family probably also played a role.

In order to avoid bloodshed, Narseh proposed to make peace with both Bahram III and Wahnam. Both seem to have agreed, as no accounts of battles have been made. The reason behind Bahram III and Wahnam's quick agreement to peace may have been due to desertion amongst many of Bahram III's men. Bahram III abdicated as shah and was probably spared, whilst Wahnam was executed when Narseh entered the Sasanian capital of Ctesiphon. Narseh then summoned the aristocrats to take part in the royal referendum, a ritual which had been used since the first Sasanian shah, Ardashir I, and which Narseh now made use of in order to gain the approval of the aristocracy as a legitimate ruler instead that of a usurper. Narseh was decisively voted in favour by the majority, and guaranteed "to enter the throne of our father and our forefathers with the help of the Gods, in their name and that of our forefathers." Amongst those nobles who supported Narseh was the leading priest Kartir, which is attested in the Paikuli inscription.

Reign

War with the Romans

Background

When Narseh ascended the throne, the eastern portion of Mesopotamia (since 244) and all of Armenia (since 252) were under Iranian rule. The traditional notion of the western part of Armenia had been given to the Arsacid prince Tiridates III has been questioned. According to historian Ursula Weber, "It is quite certain" that the whole of Armenia continued to be a part of the Sasanian Empire in the 3rd century, until it was later ceded to the Romans in 298/9 after the Peace of Nisibis. The proposition of Narseh presumably following Shapur I's expansionistic approach does not match with his testimony in the Paikuli inscription; "And Caesar and the Romans were in gratitude (?) and peace and friendship with us." Contrary to the testimony, however, the two empires soon clashed with each other−in 296. From a Roman viewpoint, the mutual relations with Iran had been heavily strained due to the aggressive and expansionistic approach of Ardashir I and Shapur I. However, the conclusive causes for the Roman offensive was possibly due to their territorial losses and the disadvantageous change in the sphere of authority and influence in the Mesopotamian-Armenian lands in the 240s and 250s.

The war 

Galerius, Caesar under Emperor Diocletian, invaded Mesopotamia, which Narseh had occupied hoping to check his advance. Three battles were fought subsequently, the first two of which were indecisive. In the third fought at Callinicum, Galerius suffered a complete defeat and was forced to retreat. Galerius crossed the Euphrates into Syria to join his father-in-law Diocletian at Antioch. On his arrival at Antioch, Galerius was rebuked by Diocletian who disgraced him for his shameful defeat at the hands of Narseh. Vowing to take revenge, Galerius made preparations throughout the winter of 297 and invaded Armenia with 25,000 men.

Supported by the Armenians, Galerius surprised Narseh in his camp at the Battle of Satala and inflicted a crushing defeat on the latter, forcing him to flee in haste. His wife, prisoners, his sisters and a number of his children were captured apart from his prodigious military chest. Eastern Mesopotamia was recovered by the Romans and Tiridates was reinstated as the monarch of Armenia.

Peace negotiations 
Anxious to make peace with the Romans, Narseh dispatched his envoy Aphraban to Galerius with the following message:

But Galerius dismissed Aphraban without giving any definite answer, at the same time accusing the Iranians of ill-treating Valerian. In the meantime, he consulted Diocletian at Nisibis, and he persuaded Galerius to offer terms of peace to the Iranians. Accordingly, terms of peace were agreed upon, and were ratified by a treaty concluded by Narseh with the Romans.

According to this treaty,

 Five provinces beyond the Tigris were to be ceded to the Romans. One writer gives these provinces as Ingilene, Sophene, Arzanene, Corduene, and Zabdicene; by another as Arzanene, Moxoene, Zabdicene, Rehimene, and Corduene.
 The semi-independent kingdom of Armenia was to be extended up to the  fortress of Zintha, in Media.
 Iran was expected to relinquish all her rights over Iberia.
 Formal dealings between Iran and Rome would henceforth be conducted at Nisibis.

Narseh did not survive for long after the conclusion of this humiliating treaty. He died in 303 and was succeeded by his son, Hormizd II.

Coinage 
The title of Narseh on his coins was the typical Mazdēsn bay Narsē šāhān šāh Ērān ud Anērān kēčihr az yazdān ("the Mazda-worshiping, divine Narseh, King of Kings of Iran(ians) and non-Iran(ians), whose image/brilliance is from the gods"). The iconography of Narseh's coins can be categorized into three phases. The first and second phases portray him wearing a palmette crown, albeit with two different hairstyles. In the third phase, he is wearing a lamellar crown along with a different hairstyle.

The Paikuli inscription
The Paikuli inscription in present-day Iraqi Kurdistan is the only source that describes the reign of Bahram III and the rise of Narseh to the throne. Unlike Shapur I's inscription at the Ka'ba-ye Zartosht, the Paikuli inscription omits the use of Greek, but still uses Parthian and Middle Persian. This, however, marks the last time that Parthian is used in Sasanian royal records. The inscription, along with Shapur I's inscription, demonstrates that the organization of the early Sasanian Empire did not contrast much to its predecessor, the Parthian Empire. Like the Parthian monarch, the Sasanian monarch used the title of Shahanshah ("King of Kings"), ruling as the overlord of other lesser kings, such as the king of Adiabene.

Rock relief 

While ruling as king of Iran, Narseh had a rock relief carved at Naqsh-e Rostam, between the burial site of the Achaemenid kings Darius the Great and Xerxes I. The relief depicts an investiture scene, with Narseh, wearing a lamellar crown, surrounded by his family. Narseh is receiving the ring of kingship from a female figure that is frequently assumed to be the goddess Anahita. However, some scholars have suggested that this might be his queen, Shapurdukhtak. The figure standing behind Narseh is most likely the crown prince Hormizd, due to his cap being the form of that of an animal protome, which was typically worn by Sasanian heirs.

Titles 
Throughout his lifetime, Narseh is known to have had several titles, attested in contemporary chronicles, four inscriptions (ŠKZ, NVŠ, NPi, ŠṬBn-I) and his coins.

 As governor of Hind, Sakastan and Turan; ēr mazdēsn Narseh, šāh Hind, Sagestān ud Turestān tā drayā damb ("the Iranian, Mazda-worshipping Narseh, king of Hind(estan), Sagestan and Turan up to the seacoast").
 As governor of Armenia: šāh Armenān ("King of Armenia").
 During his rule as king of Iran, he assumed the titles of his predecessors: ptkly ZNH mzdysn bgy nlsḥy MLKʾn MLKʾ ʾyrʾn W ʾnyrʾn MNW ctry MN yzdʾn, "This (is) the image of the Mazda-worshipping god Narseh, king of kings of Eran and Aneran, whose seed (is) from the gods" in the inscription of his brother, Bahram I, which he had altered.
 The title of Narseh ī Abzūdxwarrah ("Narseh, whose xwarrah blossoms"), which Narseh had most likely received by his supporters at the gathering at Paikuli.

Notes

References

Sources

Further reading

External links 
The Civilizations of the Ancient Near East Volume VII by George Rawlinson (Project Gutenberg)

3rd-century births
303 deaths
3rd-century Sasanian monarchs
People of the Roman–Sasanian Wars
4th-century Sasanian monarchs
Sasanian governors of Sakastan
Shahnameh characters
Sasanian governors of Armenia
3rd-century kings of Armenia